is a centaur and damocloid on a retrograde and highly eccentric orbit from the outer region of the Solar System. It was first observed on 17 September 2017 by the Pan-STARRS survey at Haleakala Observatory in Hawaii, United States.

See also 
 
  – retrograde centaur, damocloid, and potential co-orbital with Saturn
  – another retrograde centaur, damocloid, and potential co-orbital with Saturn

References

External links 
 

Damocloids

Minor planet object articles (unnumbered)

20170917
Minor planets with a retrograde orbit